Lauren Ahrens (born 19 August 1991) is an Australian rules footballer playing for Gold Coast in the AFL Women's (AFLW).

Early life
Ahrens was born on the Gold Coast and attended Palm Beach Currumbin State High School throughout her upbringing. Upon graduation, she relocated to Victoria and began studying at Melbourne University. She began playing Australian rules football for the first time with the Melbourne University Mugars team. She also had stints with VFLW teams St Kilda and Essendon.

AFLW career
Ahrens was pre-listed by her hometown team, the Gold Coast Suns, in the lead up to the 2019 AFL Women's draft. She made her debut against  at Blacktown ISP Oval in the opening round of the 2020 season. Aherns has played almost every game at the Suns, and in the 2021 season she became the club's most consistent player and was recognised as the team's best and fairest player after collecting 238 best and fairest votes, only 5 ahead of second-placed Alison Drennan. Ahrens achieved selection in Champion Data's 2021 AFLW All-Star stats team, after leading the league for average metres gained in the 2021 AFL Women's season, totalling 321.1 a game.

Statistics 
Statistics are correct to the end of the 2021 season.

|- style="background-color:#EAEAEA"
! scope="row" style="text-align:center" | 2020
| 
| 7 || 7 || 1 || 1 || 56 || 46 || 102 || 17 || 20 || 0.1 || 0.1 || 8.0 || 6.6 || 14.6 || 2.4 || 2.9 ||
|- 
! scope="row" style="text-align:center" | 2021
|style="text-align:center;"|
| 7 || 9 || 0 || 0 || 100 || 50 || 150 || 43 || 21 || 0.0 || 0.0 || 11.1 || 5.5 || 16.6 || 4.7 || 2.3 ||
|- class="sortbottom"
! colspan=3 | Career
! 16
! 1
! 1
! 156
! 96
! 252
! 60
! 41
! 0.1
! 0.1 
! 9.8
! 6.1
! 15.8
! 3.8
! 2.6
! 
|}

References

External links 

1991 births
Living people
Sportspeople from the Gold Coast, Queensland
Sportswomen from Queensland
Australian rules footballers from Queensland
Gold Coast Football Club (AFLW) players